Rose Lowder (born 1941) is a French-Peruvian avant-garde filmmaker.

Early life
Lowder was born in the Miraflores District of Lima, Peru. She attended the San Silvestre School.

Lowder studied painting and sculpture in Lima at The Art Center and the School of Fine Arts. She moved to the United States for a brief period and then to London. There, Lowder studied at the Regent Street Polytechnic, which closed before she had finished her studies, and then at the Chelsea School of Art.

Career
While working as an artist, Lowder made a living as a film editor in London. She edited documentaries, feature films, and advertisements. Lowder worked as an assistant editor at the BBC from 1965 to 1967. She and her partner Alain-Alcide Sudre moved to France, eventually ending up in Paris. They began to organize regular screenings of avant-garde films. In 1982, she and Sudre established the Archives du film expérimental d'Avignon.

Filmography

 Roulement, rouerie, aubage (1978)
 Certaines observations (1979)
 Couleurs mécaniques (1979)
 Champ provençal (1979)
 Parcelle (1979)
 Retour d'un repère (1979)
 Rue des Teinturiers (1979)
 Les tournesols (1982)
 Les tournesols colorés (1983)
 Scènes de la vie française: Arles (1985)
 Scènes de la vie française: Avignon (1986)
 Scènes de la vie française: La Ciotat (1986)
 Scènes de la vie française: Paris (1986)
 Impromptu (1989)
 Quidproquo (1992)
 Bouquets 1–10 (1995)
 Les coquelicots (2000)
 Voiliers et coquelicots (2002)
 L'invitation au voyage with Carl Brown (2003)
 Bouquets 21–30 (2005)
 Habitat (2006)
 Cote jardin (2007)
 Bouquets 11–20 (2010)
 Jardins du marais (2010)
 Jardin du soleil (2010)
 Rien d'extraordinaire (2010)
 Beijing 1988 (2011)
 Jardins du sel (2011)
 Sous le soleil (2011)
 Sources (2012)
 foryannfromrose (2014)
 TARTARUGHE D'ACQUA (2016)

References

External links
 

1941 births
Alumni of Chelsea College of Arts
Alumni of the Regent Street Polytechnic
Living people
People from Lima
Peruvian women film directors
Women experimental filmmakers